JK Tallinna Kalev U21 is a football club based in Tallinn, Estonia. It is Tallinna Kalev's reserve team. They play their home games at artificial turf next to Kalev Central Stadium. Reserve teams in Estonia play in the same league system as their senior teams rather than a separate league. Reserve teams, however, cannot play in the same division as their senior team. Players can switch between senior and reserve teams.

History

Tallinna Kalev U21 in Estonian Football

Players

Current squad
As of 22 June 2015.

Tallinna Kalev IIIAs of 22 June 2015.

References

External links
Kalev II website
Team at Estonian Football Association

Tallinna Kalev II
Estonian reserve football teams
2004 establishments in Estonia